Adurthi Subba Rao (16 December 1912 – 1 October 1975) was an Indian film director, cinematographer, screenwriter, editor and producer known for his works predominantly in Telugu cinema. Rao is widely regarded as the intellectual fountain head of Indian drama films. He has garnered seven National Film Awards. Rao made his foray into cinema as Associate to Uday Shankar in the 1948 dance film Kalpana, which was showcased in the "Treasures from National Film Archive of India" at the 39th International Film Festival of India.

The 1960 film Nammina Bantu was a work of drama in the broader sense achieved by means of actors who represented mimesis throughout the narrative. The film was simultaneously shot in Tamil as Pattaliyin Vetri. Upon release both versions received critical acclaim. The Telugu work was screened at the San Sebastián International Film Festival. The film also won the National Film Award for Best Feature Film in Telugu for that year.

The 1964 film Doctor Chakravarthy was adapted by Rao based on Koduri Kousalya Devi's Novel Chakrabhramanam. The box office success was awarded the National Film Award for Best Feature Film in Telugu, and the state Nandi Awards for that year. Rao's next work was Mooga Manasulu based on the concept of reincarnation, the first of its kind in Indian cinema in the genre of semi-fiction intended to be more serious in tone with elements that encourage a broader range of moods throughout the narrative. The film was remade in Hindi as Milan (1967) directed by Rao himself, while the Tamil Praptham (1971) was adapted from Rao's work. The Telugu version received the National Film Award for Best Feature Film in Telugu,
and the Filmfare Best Film Award (Telugu) in 1964 and was screened at the Karlovy Vary International Film Festival.

In 1968, Rao experimented with courtroom drama and detective fiction in his work Sudigundalu, the film received special mention at the Tashkent and Moscow Film Festivals for its inherent "film with a key" narrative. The film has garnered the National Film Award for Best Feature Film in Telugu, The Nandi Award for Best Feature Film, and the Filmfare Award for Best Film - Telugu for that year and was featured at the International Film Festival of India.

Early life and career
He was born to Sathanna Panthulu and Rajalakshmamma on 16 December 1912. His father was the Tehsildar of Rajahmundry. Adurthi Subbarao completed school final (Matriculation) at the age of 14.  He joined Kakinada PR College to do his Pre-University Course.
He joined the St. Xavier's College, Mumbai in a three-year course of Photography, and completed two years.

He then worked in the processing and printing department of Bombay Film Lab. Then he joined film editor Dina Narvekar as his assistant. He started his film career as a cinematographer, editor and screenwriter. His directorial journey started as an assistant director in Bollywood, under Uday Shankar for his Hindi film Kalpana. He has also worked as an editor and assistant director for the film. His debut film as an editor was Tamil film Parijatapaharanam.

Mainstream
In 1957 Rao adapted Sharat Chandra Chatterjee's Bengali novel Nishkruti, which was simultaneously shot in Telugu as Thodi Kodallu, and Tamil as Engal Veettu Mahalakshmi (1957); both movies were made simultaneously by the same banner and director, and some of the scenes and artists are the same in both versions. The film won the Certificate of merit for Best Feature Film in Telugu. In 1959 Rao directed romantic drama Mangalya Balam, Rao adapted Mangalya Balam to the Telugu screen from the Bengali work Agni Pariksha, The Telugu version was simultaneously shot in Tamil as Manjal Mahimai; both versions became box office successes. The former  winning the National Film Award for Best Feature Film in Telugu, and the
Filmfare Award for Best Film – Telugu in 1960. In 1961, Rao directed K. S. Gopalakrishnan's Kumudham; remade in Telugu as Manchi Manasulu (1962). The film received Certificate of Merit for Third Best Feature Film at 9th National Film Awards. Rao scripted and directed the 1976 biographical film; Mahakavi Kshetrayya based on the life of Kshetrayya, Rao had expired in the middle of the making of the film; and director C. S. Rao completed the rest of the shoot.

Mentor to K. Viswanath and Krishna
Rao's Biography has been published by veteran actor Krishna, who made his Telugu film debut under the direction of Subba Rao. Veteran director K. Viswanath has worked as an associate director of Subba Rao for many years. The Telugu film chamber of commerce has instituted the Adurthi Subba Rao Award in his honor.

Filmography

Awards

National Film Awards
National Film Award for Best Feature Film in Telugu  
Sudigundalu - 1967
Doctor Chakravarthy - 1964
Mooga Manasulu - 1963
Nammina Bantu - 1960 
Mangalya Balam - 1959 
Thodi Kodallu (1957) 

National Film Award for Best Feature Film in Tamil 
Kumudham (1961) 
 
Nandi Awards
1964 - Nandi Award for Best Feature Film - Doctor Chakravarthy
1967 - Nandi Award for Best Feature Film - Sudigundalu
1976 - Nandi Award for Best Feature Film - Mahakavi Kshetrayya

Filmfare Awards South
Filmfare Award for Best Film – Telugu - Sudigundalu

References

External links
 
 
 Adurthi Subba Rao at 
 Adurthi Subba Rao at Kinopoisk

Telugu film directors
Film producers from Andhra Pradesh
Cinematographers from Andhra Pradesh
Telugu film cinematographers
St. Xavier's College, Mumbai alumni
Telugu film producers
Filmfare Awards South winners
Nandi Award winners
1912 births
1975 deaths
Writers from Rajahmundry
Film directors from Andhra Pradesh
20th-century Indian film directors
Hindi-language film directors
Tamil film directors
Telugu screenwriters
Hindi screenwriters
20th-century Indian dramatists and playwrights
Screenwriters from Andhra Pradesh
20th-century Indian screenwriters